The 2014 Open du Pays d'Aix was a professional tennis tournament played on clay courts. It was the first edition of the tournament which was part of the 2014 ATP Challenger Tour. It took place in Aix-en-Provence, France between 5 and 11 May 2014.

Singles main-draw entrants

Seeds

 1 Rankings are as of April 28, 2014.

Other entrants
The following players received wildcards into the singles main draw:
  Axel Michon
  Julien Obry
  Florent Serra
  Martin Vaisse

The following players received entry from the qualifying draw:
  Jonathan Eysseric
  Laurent Lokoli
  Yann Marti
  Henri Laaksonen

The following players received entry as a lucky loser:
  Jordi Samper Montaña

Doubles main-draw entrants

Seeds

1 Rankings as of April 28, 2014.

Other entrants 
The following pairs received wildcards into the singles main draw:
 Maxime Chazal /  Maxime Tchoutakian
 Florent Serra /  Maxime Teixeira
 Tristan Lamasine /  Julien Obry

Champions

Singles

 Diego Sebastián Schwartzman def.  Andreas Beck, 6–7(4–7), 6–3, 6–2

Doubles

 Diego Sebastián Schwartzman /  Horacio Zeballos def.  Andreas Beck /  Martin Fischer, 6–4, 3–6, [10–5]

External links
Official Website

Open du Pays d'Aix
Open du Pays d'Aix
Open